Thomas "Tony" Leach (23 September 1903 – 1970) was an English international footballer, who played as a centre half.

Career
Born in Rotherham, Leach played professionally for Sheffield Wednesday and Newcastle United, and earned two caps for England in 1930. He played in Sheffield Wednesday's 2–1 defeat by Arsenal in the Charity Shield at Stamford Bridge in October 1930.

References

1903 births
1970 deaths
English footballers
England international footballers
Sheffield Wednesday F.C. players
Newcastle United F.C. players
English Football League players
English Football League representative players
Association football central defenders